Nils Håkan Lindström (born 21 March 1952 in Luleå, Sweden) is a Swedish former Olympic sailor in the Star class. He competed in the 1980 Summer Olympics together with Peter Sundelin, where they finished 4th.

References

Living people
1952 births
Olympic sailors of Sweden
Swedish male sailors (sport)
Star class sailors
Sailors at the 1980 Summer Olympics – Star
People from Luleå
Sportspeople from Norrbotten County